The 1938 24 Hours of Le Mans was the 15th Grand Prix of Endurance, and took place on 18 and 19 June 1938.

Official results

Did not finish

Statistics
 Fastest Lap – #19 Raymond Sommer – 5:13.8
 Distance – 3180.94 km
 Average Speed – 132.539 km/h

Trophy winners
 13th Rudge-Whitworth Biennial Cup – #28 Adler
 Index of Performance – #51 Amédée Gordini

24 Hours of Le Mans races
Le Mans
1938 in French motorsport